Eagle Point Township may refer to the following townships in the United States:

 Eagle Point Township, Ogle County, Illinois
 Eagle Point Township, Marshall County, Minnesota